"Medicine" is a song by Grace Potter and the Nocturnals, released on their eponymous album (2010).  It is the lead single, was originally intended as the name of the album, and was promoted as such in numerous interviews and early reviews, but the album title was changed shortly after the replacement of producer T Bone Burnett in favor of Dave Matthews Band producer, Mark Batson.

Meaning
Potter has said of the song, "Matt and Scott came up with the music for 'Medicine'—the drum roll and that killer guitar hook—months before I came up with the lyrics or the vocal melody. It gets across the emotion of somebody trying to steal your man away and then fighting for what's yours, getting back to a place where you're in control. I picture my adversary as a young Stevie Nicks, but with long black hair, who shows up, woos everybody and freaks me out, until I realize there is something I can do—then I step up and make my own magic. It's my favorite song to perform. That and 'Paris' are the sexiest, feistiest and the most fun of anything we've ever done."

Personnel
Adapted credits from the booklet.
Grace Potter – lead vocals, Hammond organ
Scott Tournet – lead guitar, loops, vocals
Benny Yurco – rhythm guitar
Catherine Popper – bass guitar
Matt Burr – drums, percussion

Release and reception
"Medicine" was released in the US as a single on December 14, 2010, and December 28, 2010 in the UK. The song has been very well received by critics and fans alike, becoming a regular song at every show the band performs. WRBC, a Maine-based music magazine said of "Medicine", "The single 'Medicine' represents some of the best elements of Ms. Potter's revamped sound, most notably her songwriting and thumping classic rock guitar lines." The song has received heavy radio play in Vermont and Maine, being "a regular request" according to the rock stations 102.9 WBLM, and Rock 93.9 FM The Valleys Rock Station.

Music video
On September 15, 2010, on their official Myspace page, Grace Potter and the Nocturnals announced they were filming "Medicine" as the second music video for the album, for release in December 2010.

Track versions
 "Medicine" (LP version) (4:06) on Grace Potter and the Nocturnals

References

2010 singles
Grace Potter and the Nocturnals songs
Hollywood Records singles
2010 songs
Song recordings produced by Mark Batson